Harrisburg is the capital city of the Commonwealth of Pennsylvania, United States, and the seat of Dauphin County. With a population of 50,135 as of 2021, Harrisburg is the 9th largest city and 15th largest municipality in Pennsylvania.

Harrisburg is situated on the east bank of the Susquehanna River. It is the larger principal city of the Harrisburg–Carlisle metropolitan statistical area, also known as the Susquehanna Valley, which had a population of 591,712 as of 2020, making it the fourth most populous metropolitan area in Pennsylvania after the Philadelphia, Pittsburgh, and Lehigh Valley metropolitan areas.  

Harrisburg played a role in American history during the Westward Migration, the American Civil War, and the Industrial Revolution. During part of the 19th century, the building of the Pennsylvania Canal and later the Pennsylvania Railroad allowed Harrisburg to develop into one of the most industrialized cities in the Northeastern United States. In the mid-to-late 20th century, the city's economic fortunes fluctuated with its major industries consisting of government, heavy manufacturing, agriculture, and food services.

The Pennsylvania Farm Show, the largest indoor agriculture exposition in the U.S., was first held in Harrisburg in 1917 and has been held there every early-to-mid January since. The city also hosts the annual Great American Outdoor Show, the largest of its kind in the world, among many other events. Harrisburg experienced the Three Mile Island accident on March 28, 1979, in nearby Middletown.

In 2010, Forbes rated Harrisburg as the second-best place in the U.S. to raise a family. Despite the city's past financial troubles, in 2010 The Daily Beast website ranked 20 metropolitan areas across the country as being recession-proof, and the Harrisburg region was ranked seventh. The financial stability of the region is in part due to the high concentration of state and federal government agencies.

History

Founding
Harrisburg's site along the Susquehanna River is thought to have been inhabited by Native Americans as early as 3000 BC. Known to the Native Americans as "Peixtin", or "Paxtang", the area was an important resting place and crossroads for Native American traders with trails leading from the Delaware to the Ohio rivers and from the Potomac to the Upper Susquehanna intersecting there.

17th century
The first European contact with Native Americans in Pennsylvania was made by Englishman Captain John Smith, who journeyed from Virginia up the Susquehanna River in 1608 and visited with the Susquehanna tribe.

18th century

In 1785, John Harris, Jr. made plans to lay out a town on his father's land, which he named Harrisburg. In the spring of 1785, the town was formally surveyed by William Maclay, who was a son-in-law of John Harris, Sr. In 1791, Harrisburg became incorporated, and in October 1812 it was named the Pennsylvania state capital, which it has remained ever since. The assembling here of the highly sectional Harrisburg Convention in 1827 (signaling what may have been the birth of lobbying on a national scale) led to the passage of the high protective-tariff bill of 1828. 

In 1839, William Henry Harrison and John Tyler were nominated for president and vice president of the United States at the first national convention of the Whig Party of the United States, which was held in Harrisburg.

19th century

Before Harrisburg gained its first industries, it was a scenic, pastoral town, typical of most of the day: compact and surrounded by farmland. In 1822, the impressive brick capitol was completed for $200,000.

It was Harrisburg's strategic location which gave it an advantage over many other towns.  It was settled as a trading post in 1719 at a location important to Westward expansion. The importance of the location was that it was at a pass in a mountain ridge. The Susquehanna River flowed generally west to east at this location, providing a route for boat traffic from the east.  The head of navigation was a short distance northwest of the town, where the river flowed through the pass. Persons arriving from the east by boat had to exit at Harrisburg and prepare for an overland journey westward through the mountain pass.  Harrisburg assumed importance as a provisioning stop at this point where westward bound pioneers transitioned from river travel to overland travel. It was partly because of its strategic location that the state legislature selected the small town of Harrisburg to become the state capital in 1812.

The grandeur of the Colonial Revival capitol dominated the quaint town. The streets were dirt, but orderly and platted in grid pattern.  The Pennsylvania Canal was built in 1834 and coursed the length of the town. The residential houses were situated on only a few city blocks stretching southward from the capitol. They were mostly one story. No factories were present but there were blacksmith shops and other businesses.

During the first part of the 19th century, Harrisburg was a notable stopping place along the Underground Railroad, as persons escaping slavery utilized the Susquehanna River to access food and supplies before heading north towards Canada.

During the American Civil War, Harrisburg was a significant training center for the Union Army, with tens of thousands of troops passing through Camp Curtin. It was also a major rail center for the Union and a vital link between the Atlantic coast and the Midwest, with several railroads running through the city and spanning the Susquehanna River. As a result of this importance, it was a target of General Robert E. Lee's Army of Northern Virginia during its two invasions. The first time during the 1862 Maryland Campaign, when Lee planned to capture the city after taking Harpers Ferry, West Virginia, but was prevented from doing so by the Battle of Antietam and his subsequent retreat back into Virginia. The second attempt was made during the Gettysburg Campaign in 1863 and was more substantial. Under orders from Gen. Robert E. Lee directly, Confederate Lt. Gen. Richard S. Ewell's Second Corps were tasked with capturing Harrisburg and disrupting the vital Union supply and rail lines. The Second Corp were ultimately unsuccessful in both overcoming the local Union defenses and crossing the rain bloated Susquehanna into Harrisburg itself, and were forced to retreat southward to regroup with Lee's main Confederate force. This attempt marked the northernmost advance of the Confederate Army during the Civil War.

On July 3, 1863, the artillery barrage that marked the beginning of Pickett's Charge of the Battle of Gettysburg was heard from Harrisburg, almost 40 miles away.

Harrisburg's importance in the latter half of the 19th century was in the steel industry.  It was an important railroad center as well. Steel and iron became dominant industries. Steel and other industries continued to play a major role in the local economy throughout the latter part of the 19th century. The city was the center of enormous railroad traffic and its steel industry supported large furnaces, rolling mills, and machine shops. The Pennsylvania Steel Company plant, which opened in nearby Steelton in 1866, was the first in the country; later operated by Bethlehem Steel.

Its first large scale iron foundries were put into operation shortly after 1850.
As industries nationwide entered a phase of great expansion and technological improvement, so did industries – and in particular the steel industry – in Harrisburg.  This can be attributed to a combination of factors that were typical of what existed in other successful industrial cities: rapid rail expansion; nearby markets for goods; and nearby sources for raw product.

With Harrisburg poised for growth in steel production, the Borough of Steelton became the ideal location for this type of industry.  It was a wide swath of flat land located south of the city, with rail and canal access running its entire 4 mile length.  There was plenty of room for houses and its own downtown section. Steelton was a company town, opened in 1866 by the Pennsylvania Steel Company. Highly innovative in its steel making process, it became the first mill in the United States to make steel railroad rails by contract.  In its heyday Steelton was home to more than 16,000 residents from 33 different ethnic groups.  All were employed in the steel industry, or had employment in services that supported it.  In the late 19th century, no less than five major steel mills and foundries were located in Steelton. Each contained a maze of buildings; conveyances for moving the products; large yards for laying down equipment; and facilities for loading their product on trains. Stacks from these factories constantly belched smoke. With housing and a small downtown area within walking distance, these were the sights and smells that most Steelton residents saw every day.

The rail yard was another area of Harrisburg that saw rapid and thorough change during the years of industrialization. This was a wide expanse of about two dozen railroad tracks that grew from the single track of the early 1850s. By the late 19th century, this area was the width of about two city blocks and formed what amounted to a barrier along the eastern edge of the city: passable only by bridge. Three large and ornately embellished passenger depots were built by as many rail lines.  Pennsylvania Railroad was the largest rail line in Harrisburg. It built huge repair facilities and two large roundhouses in the 1860s and 1870s to handle its enormous freight and passenger traffic and to maintain its colossal infrastructure. Its rails ran the length of Harrisburg, along its eastern border. It had a succession of three passenger depots, each built on the site of the predecessor, and each of high style architecture, including a train shed to protect passengers from inclement weather. At its peak in 1904, it made 100 passenger stops per day. It extended westward to Pittsburgh; across the entire state.  It also went eastward to Philadelphia, serving Steelton en route. The vital anthracite coal mines in the Allegheny Mountains were reached by the Northern Central Railroad. The Lebanon Valley Railroad extended eastward to Philadelphia with spurs to New York City. Another rail line was the Philadelphia and Reading Railroad which provided service to Philadelphia and other points east.

Allison Hill was Harrisburg's first suburb. It was located east of the city on a prominent bluff, accessed by bridges across a wide swath of train tracks. It was developed in the late 19th century and offered affluent Harrisburgers the opportunity to live in the suburbs only a few hundred yards from their jobs in the city, and as the city expanded it included Allison Hill in its boundaries. In 1886 a single horse trolley line was established from the city to Allison Hill. Easy access was later achieved via the State Street Bridge leading east from the Capitol complex and the Market Street Bridge leading from the city's prominent business district. The most desirable section of Allison Hill at the time was Mount Pleasant, which was characterized by large Colonial Revival style houses with yards for the very wealthy and smaller but still well-built row houses lining the main street for the moderately wealthy. State Street, leading from the Capitol directly toward Allison Hill, was planned to provide a grand view of the Capitol dome for those approaching the city from Allison Hill. This trend towards outlying residential areas began slowly in the late 19th century and was largely confined to the trolley line, but the growth of automobile ownership quickened the trend and spread out the population.

20th century

In the early 20th century, the city of Harrisburg was in need of change. Without proper sanitation, diseases such as typhoid began killing many citizens of Harrisburg. Seeing these necessary changes, several Harrisburg residents became involved in the City Beautiful movement.  The project focused on providing better transportation, spaces for recreation, sanitation, landscaping, and parks for those living in cities, as research showed that a person with access to amenities would be a happier person. In December 1900, a reformer named Mira Lloyd Dock, who had recently encountered well-ordered urban centers on an international trip to Europe, gave a lecture on "The City Beautiful" to Harrisburg's Board of Trade. Other prominent citizens of the city such as J. Horace McFarland and Vance McCormick advocated urban improvements which were influenced by European urban planning design and the World's Columbian Exposition. Warren Manning was hired to help bring about these changes.  Specifically, their efforts greatly enlarged the Harrisburg park system, creating Riverfront Park, Reservoir Park, the Italian Lake and Wildwood Park.  In addition, schemes were undertaken for new water filtration, burial of electric wires, the paving of roads, and the creation of a modern sanitary sewer system. The efforts to improve the city also paralleled the construction of an expanded monumental Capitol complex in 1906 which led, in turn, to the displacement of the Old Eighth Ward, one of the most ethnically and racially diverse communities in Harrisburg.

The decades between 1920 and 1970 were characterized by industrial decline and population shift from the city to the suburbs. Like most other cities which faced a loss of their industrial base, Harrisburg shifted to a service-oriented base, with industries such as health care and convention centers playing a big role. Harrisburg's greatest problem was a shrinking city population after 1950.  This loss in population followed a national trend and was a delayed result of the decline of Harrisburg's steel industry. This decline began almost imperceptibly in the late 1880s, but did not become evident until the early 20th century.

After being held in place for about 5 years by WWII armament production, the population peaked shortly after the war, but then took a long-overdue dive as people fled from the city.  Hastening the white flight to the suburbs were the cheap and available houses being built away from the crime and deteriorating situation of the city. The reduction in city population coincided with the rise in population of the Metropolitan Statistical Area. The trend continued until the 1990s.

The Pennsylvania Farm Show, the largest indoor agriculture exposition in the United States, was first held in 1917 and has been held every January since then. The present location of the Show is the Pennsylvania Farm Show Complex & Expo Center, located at the corner of Maclay and Cameron streets.

On March 28, 1979, the Three Mile Island nuclear plant, along the Susquehanna River located in Londonderry Township which is south of Harrisburg, suffered a partial meltdown. Although the meltdown was contained and radiation leakages were minimal, there were still worries that an evacuation would be necessary. Governor Dick Thornburgh, on the advice of Nuclear Regulatory Commission Chairman Joseph Hendrie, advised the evacuation "of pregnant women and pre-school age children ... within a five-mile radius of the Three Mile Island facility." Within days, 140,000 people had left the area.

Stephen R. Reed was elected mayor in 1981 and served until 2009, making him the city's longest-serving mayor. In an effort to end the city's long period of economic troubles, he initiated several projects to attract new business and tourism to the city. Several museums and hotels such as Whitaker Center for Science and the Arts, the National Civil War Museum and the Hilton Harrisburg and Towers were built during his term, along with many office buildings and residential structures. Several minor league professional sports franchises, including the Harrisburg Senators of the Eastern League, the Harrisburg Heat indoor soccer club, and Penn FC of the United Soccer League began operations in the city during his tenure as mayor. While praised for the vast number of economic improvements, Reed has also been criticized for population loss and mounting debt. For example, during a budget crisis the city was forced to sell $8 million worth of Western and American-Indian artifacts collected by Mayor Reed for a never-realized museum celebrating the American West.

21st century

During the nearly 30-year tenure of former Mayor Stephen Reed from 1981 to 2009, city officials ignored legal restraints on the use of bond proceeds, as Reed spent the money pursuing interests including collecting Civil War and Wild West memorabilia – some of which was found in Reed's home after his arrest on corruption charges. Infrastructure was left unrepaired, and the heart of the city's financial woes was a trash-to-electricity plant, the Harrisburg incinerator, which was supposed to generate income but instead, because of increased borrowing, incurred a debt of $320 million.

Missing audits and convoluted transactions, including swap agreements, make it difficult to state how much debt the city owes. Some estimates put total debt over $1.5 billion, which would mean that every resident would owe $30,285.  These numbers do not reflect the school system deficit, the school district's $437 million long-term debt, nor unfunded pension and healthcare obligations.

Harrisburg was the first municipality ever in the history of the U.S. Securities and Exchange Commission to be charged with securities fraud, for misleading statements about its financial health. The city agreed to a plea bargain to settle the case.

In October 2011, Harrisburg filed for Chapter 9 bankruptcy when four members of the seven-member City Council voted to file a bankruptcy petition in order to prevent the Commonwealth of Pennsylvania from taking over the city's finances. Bankruptcy Judge Mary France dismissed the petition on the grounds that the City Council majority had filed it over the objection of Mayor Linda Thompson, reasoning that the filing not only required the mayor's approval but had circumvented state laws concerning financially distressed cities.

Instead, a state-appointed receiver took charge of the city's finances.  Governor Tom Corbett appointed bond attorney David Unkovic as the city's receiver, but Unkovic resigned after only four months. Unkovic blamed disdain for legal restraints on contracts and debt for creating Harrisburg's intractable financial problem and said the corrupt influence of creditors and political cronies prevented fixing it.

As creditors began to file lawsuits to seize and sell off city assets, a new receiver, William B. Lynch, was appointed. The City Council opposed the new receiver's plans for tax increases and advocated a stay of the creditor lawsuits with a bankruptcy filing, while Mayor Thompson continued to oppose bankruptcy. State legislators crafted a moratorium to prevent Harrisburg from declaring bankruptcy, and after the moratorium expired, the law stripped the city government of the authority to file for bankruptcy and conferred it on the state receiver.

After two years of negotiations, in August 2013 Receiver Lynch revealed his comprehensive voluntary plan for resolving Harrisburg's fiscal problems. The complex plan called for creditors to write down or postpone some debt.  To pay the remainder, Harrisburg sold the troubled incinerator, leased its parking garages for forty years, and was to briefly go further into debt by issuing new bonds. Receiver Lynch had also called for setting up nonprofit investment corporations to oversee infrastructure improvement (repairing the city's crumbling roads and water and sewer lines), pensions, and economic development. These were intended to allow nonprofit fundraising and to reduce the likelihood of mismanagement by the then-dysfunctional city government.

Harrisburg's City Council and the state Commonwealth Court approved the plan, and became implemented. The city balanced its budget in the late 2010s, was expected to have a surplus of $1 million in 2019, and maintained a surplus in 2020 despite the COVID-19 pandemic.

Geography

Topography
Harrisburg is located at  (40.269789, -76.875613) in South Central Pennsylvania, within a two-hour drive of the metro areas of Baltimore, Washington, Philadelphia and three-hour drive of New York and Pittsburgh. Bodies of water include Paxton Creek, which empties into the Susquehanna River at Harrisburg, as well as Wildwood Lake and Italian Lake parks.

Directly to the north of Harrisburg is the Blue Mountain ridge of the Appalachian Mountains. The Cumberland Valley lies directly to the west of Harrisburg and the Susquehanna River, stretching into northern Maryland. The fertile Lebanon Valley lies to the east. Harrisburg is the northern fringe of the historic Pennsylvania Dutch Country.

The city is the county seat of Dauphin County. The adjacent counties are Northumberland County to the north; Schuylkill County to the northeast; Lebanon County to the east; Lancaster County to the south; and York County to the southwest; Cumberland County to the west; and Perry County to the northwest.

Adjacent municipalities

Harrisburg's western boundary is formed by the west shore of the Susquehanna River (the Susquehanna runs within the city boundaries), which also serves as the boundary between Dauphin and Cumberland counties. The city is divided into numerous neighborhoods and districts. Like many of Pennsylvania's cities and boroughs that are at "build-out" stage, there are several townships outside of Harrisburg city limits that, although autonomous, use the name Harrisburg for postal and name-place designation. They include the townships of: Lower Paxton, Middle Paxton, Susquehanna, Swatara and West Hanover in Dauphin County. The borough of Penbrook, located just east of Reservoir Park, was previously known as East Harrisburg. Penbrook, along with the borough of Paxtang, also located just outside the city limits, maintain Harrisburg ZIP codes as well. The United States Postal Service designates 26 ZIP codes for Harrisburg, including 13 for official use by federal and state government agencies.

Climate
Harrisburg has a variable, four-season climate lying at the beginning of the transition between the humid subtropical and humid continental zones (Köppen Cfa and Dfa, respectively). The city limits fall within the Cfa Humid subtropical climate classification, while the suburban areas and rural surroundings fall just into the Dfa Humid continental climate classification. Summer is usually hot and humid and occasional heat waves can occur. The city averages around 32 days per year with + highs, although temperatures reaching  are rare. Seven months average above 50 °F (10 °C) and three months average above 22 °C (71.6 °F.) Summer thunderstorms also occur relatively frequently. Autumn is a pleasant season, when the humidity and temperatures fall to more comfortable values. The hardiness zone is 7a/7b.

A major snowstorm can also occasionally occur, and some winters snowfall totals can exceed , while in other winters, the region may receive very little snowfall. Snow that does fall often melts away quickly. Spring is also a pleasant time of year for outdoor activities. Precipitation is well-distributed and generous in most months, though July is clearly the wettest and February the driest.

Cityscape

Neighborhoods

Downtown Harrisburg, which includes the Pennsylvania State Capitol Complex, is the central core business and financial center for the  Harrisburg–Carlisle metropolitan statistical area and serves as the seat of government for Dauphin County and the Commonwealth of Pennsylvania. There are over a dozen large neighborhoods and historic districts within the city.

Architecture
Harrisburg's architecture spans over 200 years of evolving construction and design and thus contains a breadth of various architectural styles. Six Municipal Historic Districts, multiple National Historic Districts, and Architectural Conservation Overlay Districts have in turn have been established to preserve and guide any new development of areas with respect to their character.

Harrisburg is home to the Pennsylvania State Capitol. The building was designed by Joseph Miller Huston and is adorned with sculpture, most notably the two groups, Love and Labor, the Unbroken Law and The Burden of Life, the Broken Law by sculptor George Grey Barnard; murals by Violet Oakley and Edwin Austin Abbey; tile floor by Henry Mercer, which tells the story of the Commonwealth of Pennsylvania. The state capitol is only the third-tallest building of Harrisburg.

Demographics

2020 census

Note: the US Census treats Hispanic/Latino as an ethnic category. This table excludes Latinos from the racial categories and assigns them to a separate category. Hispanics/Latinos can be of any race.

The six largest ethnic groups in the city are: African American (52.4%), German (15.0%), Irish (6.5%), Italian (3.3%), English (2.4%), and Dutch (1.0%). While the metropolitan area is approximately 15% German-American, 11.4% are Irish-American and 9.6% English-American. Harrisburg has one of the largest Pennsylvania Dutch communities in the nation, and also has the nation's ninth-largest Swedish-American communities in the nation.

There were 20,561 households, out of which 28.5% had children under the age of 13 living with them, 23.4% were married couples living together, 24.4% had a female householder with no husband present, and 46.9% were non-families. 39.3% of all households were made up of individuals, and 10.4% had someone living alone who was 65 years of age or older. The average household size was 2.32 and the average family size was 3.15.

In the city, the population was spread out, with 28.2% under the age of 18, 9.2% from 13 to 24, 31.0% from 25 to 44, 20.8% from 45 to 64, and 10.9% who were 65 years of age or older. The median age was 33 years. For every 100 females, there were 88.7 males. For every 100 females age 13 and over, there were 84.8 males.

The median income for a household in the city was $26,920, and the median income for a family was $29,556. Males had a median income of $90,670 versus $24,405 for females. The per capita income for the city was $15,787. About 23.4% of families and 24.6% of the population were below the poverty line, including 34.9% of those under age 13 and 16.6% of those age 65 or over. 

The very first census taken in the United States occurred in 1790. At that time Harrisburg was a small, but substantial colonial town with a population of 875 residents. With the increase of the city's prominence as an industrial and transportation center, Harrisburg reached its peak population build up in 1950, topping out at nearly 90,000 residents. Since the 1950s, Harrisburg, along with other northeastern urban centers large and small, has experienced a declining population that is ultimately fueling the growth of its suburbs, although the decline – which was very rapid in the 1960s and 1970s – has slowed considerably since the 1980s. Unlike Western and Southern states, Pennsylvania maintains a complex system of municipalities and has very little legislation on either the annexation/expansion of cities or the consolidating of municipal entities.

Economy

Harrisburg is the metropolitan center for some 400 communities. Its economy and more than 45,000 businesses are diversified with a large representation of service-related industries, especially health-care and a growing technological and biotechnology industry to accompany the dominant government field inherent to being the state's capital. National and international firms with major operations include Ahold Delhaize, ArcelorMittal Steel, HP Inc., IBM, Hershey Foods, Harsco Corporation, Ollie's Bargain Outlet, Rite Aid Corporation, Tyco Electronics, and Volvo Construction Equipment. The largest employers, the federal and state governments, provide stability to the economy. The region's extensive transportation infrastructure has allowed it to become a prominent center for trade, warehousing, and distribution.

Employers

Top 10
According to the Region Economic Development Corporation, the top employers in the region are:

People and culture

Culture

In the mid-20th century, Harrisburg was home to many nightclubs and other performance venues, including the Madrid Ballroom, the Coliseum, the Chestnut Street Hall and the Hi-Hat.  These venues featured performances from Duke Ellington, Dizzy Gillespie, Fletcher Henderson and Andy Kirk, among other jazz greats. Segregationist policy forbade these musicians from staying overnight in downtown Harrisburg, however, making the Jackson Hotel in Harrisburg's 7th Ward a hub of black musicians prior the 1960s.

Several organizations support and develop visual arts in Harrisburg. The Art Association of Harrisburg was founded in 1926 and continues to provide education and exhibits throughout the year. Additionally, the Susquehanna Art Museum, founded in 1989, offers classes, exhibits and community events. A local urban sketching group, Harrisburg Sketchers, convenes artists monthly.

Downtown Harrisburg has two major performance centers. The Whitaker Center for Science and the Arts, which was completed in 1999, is the first center of its type in the United States where education, science and the performing arts take place under one roof. The Forum, a 1,763-seat concert and lecture hall built in 1930–31, is a state-owned and operated facility located within the State Capitol Complex. Since 1931, The Forum has been home to the Harrisburg Symphony Orchestra. Other performance centers include The Capitol Room at House of Music, Arts & Culture, Open Stage of Harrisburg, Harrisburg Improv Theatre, Gamut Theatre Group, Popcorn Hat Players Children's Theatre and Theatre Harrisburg. 

Beginning in 2001, downtown Harrisburg saw a resurgence of commercial nightlife development. This has been credited with reversing the city's financial decline, and has made downtown Harrisburg a destination for events from jazz festivals to Top-40 nightclubs.

In 2004, Harrisburg hosted CowParade, an international public art exhibit that has been featured in major cities all over the world. Fiberglass sculptures of cows are decorated by local artists, and distributed over the city center, in public places such as train stations and parks. They often feature artwork and designs specific to local culture, as well as city life and other relevant themes.

Events
Harrisburg notably is home to large events occurring throughout the year which attracts visitors from across the country and internationally. 

The annual Pennsylvania Farm Show held at the Pennsylvania Farm Show Complex is the largest agricultural exhibition of its kind in the nation. Farmers from all over Pennsylvania come to show their animals and participate in competitions. Livestock are on display for people to interact with and view.
The Great American Outdoor Show, the world's largest outdoor recreation show, is held each February at the Pennsylvania Farm Show Complex drawing hundreds of thousands of visitors and includes demonstrations, seminars, calling competitions, education and safety programs, and a country music concert.
Motorama, the nation's largest all-indoor motorsports event, is held annually and features over 2,000 racers.
The Ice & Fire Festival, occurring each March downtown, exhibits ice sculptures, fire dancers, food trucks, and an ice skating rink with live music.
The Pennsylvania Auto Show is held annually at the Pennsylvania Farm Show Complex.
ArtsFest, held each spring, features juried artisans and craftsmen from across the state and country selling art and unique crafts.
Pride Festival of Central PA is the area's three-day annual gay pride event regularly attracting over 5,000 LGBTQ and straight allied supporters.
The Antique Fire Apparatus Show & Muster along Riverfront Park features displays of regional fire engines from past and present, a flea market, and firefighting competitions.
Harrisburg's Independence Day Celebration, under various names (formerly "MusicFest"), occurs each Independence Day weekend along Riverfront Park and City Island with food, live music, activities and fireworks.
Kipona Festival, inaugurated in 1916 and held each Labor Day Weekend, celebrates the Susquehanna River as a three-day festival on Riverfront Park and City Island featuring food, fireworks, live music, artist markets, canoe races, wire walkers, pet areas, and family carnival activities.
The Greenbelt's Tour de Belt is a weekend-long series of bike-related events and includes an art show and craft breweries.
Cultural Fest, put on each summer by Dauphin County and held at City Island, celebrates the multicultural diversity of the area.
Riverfront Park Concert Series, a summer pop-up concert, features national music acts each summer.
The Harrisburg Marathon runs along the riverfront and City Island and is a two-day event usually held each fall.
WoofStock, the celebration of all-things canine along with music, food and prizes, is held each September at Riverfront Park and is the largest pet adoption event on the East Coast.
BrewFest, held each October at Fort Hunter Park, features local craft beers, food and vendors.
Harrisburg's New Year's Eve Celebration downtown has live music, children's activities, and the strawberry drop and fireworks at midnight.

Media
Harrisburg area is part of the Harrisburg-Lancaster-Lebanon-York media market which consists of the lower counties in south central Pennsylvania and borders the media markets of Philadelphia and Baltimore.  It is the 43rd largest media market in the United States.

The Harrisburg area has several newspapers. The Patriot-News, which is published in Cumberland County, serves the Harrisburg area and has a tri-weekly circulation of over 100,000. The Sentinel, which is published in Carlisle, roughly 20 miles west of Harrisburg, serves many of Harrisburg's western suburbs in Cumberland County. The Press and Journal, published in Middletown, is one of many weekly general information newspapers in the Harrisburg area. There are also numerous television and radio stations in the Harrisburg/Lancaster/York area.

Newspapers
The Patriot-News
Central Penn Business Journal
Press and Journal (Pennsylvania)
Carlisle Sentinel

Television
The Harrisburg TV market is served by:
 WGAL – (NBC)
 WXBU – (Comet)
 WHBG-TV – cable-only, public access
 WHP-TV – (CBS)
 WHTM-TV – (ABC)
 WCZS-LD – (CTVN)
 WITF-TV – (PBS)
 WPMT – (Fox)
 WLYH – independent, religious
 PCN-TV, is a cable television network dedicated to 24-hour coverage of government and public affairs in the commonwealth.
 Roxbury News – independent news

Radio
According to Arbitron, Harrisburg's radio market is ranked 78th in the nation.

This is a list of FM stations in the greater Harrisburg metropolitan area.

This is a list of AM stations in the greater Harrisburg metropolitan area.

Harrisburg in film

Several feature films and television series have been filmed or set in and around Harrisburg and the greater Susquehanna Valley.

Museums, art collections, and sites of interest

 Broad Street Market, one of the oldest continuously operating farmers markets in the United States
 Dauphin County Veteran's Memorial Obelisk inspired by the classic Roman/Egyptian obelisk form; located in uptown Harrisburg
 Dauphin Narrows Statue of Liberty on the Susquehanna River north of Harrisburg
 Fort Hunter Mansion and Park, located north of downtown Harrisburg on a bluff overlooking the Susquehanna River
Harrisburg Doll Museum, which contains over 5,000 dolls and toys stretching back to 1840
 John Harris – Simon Cameron Mansion, a National Historic Landmark located in downtown Harrisburg along the river
 Market Square, originally planned in 1785 and serves as the pinnacle of downtown
 Midtown Scholar Bookstore, largest independent bookstore on the East Coast
 National Civil War Museum, located at Reservoir Park and affiliated with the Smithsonian Institution in Washington, D.C.
 Pennsylvania National Fire Museum
 Pennsylvania Farm Show Complex & Expo Center, one of the largest convention/exhibition centers on the east coast which hosts multiple annual events, most notably the Pennsylvania Farm Show
 Pennsylvania State Capitol Complex, the center of government for the commonwealth and home to the state capitol building, state archives, and state library
 Pride of the Susquehanna paddle-wheel riverboat, offering daily sightseeing tours and special theme cruises
 Reservoir Park, the largest public park in the city containing an amphitheater and playground, and connected to the Greenbelt 
 State Museum of Pennsylvania, featuring a planetarium and the Marshalls Creek Mastodon, one of the most complete mastodon fossils in North America.
 Strawberry Square, across the street from the Capitol Complex, home of many state offices and a small shopping center
 Susquehanna art museum, recently renovated and relocated in Midtown
 Art Association of Harrisburg, founded in 1926, located in the Governor Findlay Mansion
 Whitaker Center for Science and the Arts, features an IMAX theater
 Zembo Shrine Building, a significant example of Moorish Revival architecture.

Parks and recreation
The following is a list of the major parks of Harrisburg:
 Capital Area Greenbelt, a twenty mile long greenway linking city neighborhoods, parks and open spaces. It connects Wildwood Lake Park, Riverfront Park, the Harrisburg Mall, Penbrook Park, Reservoir Park, Harrisburg Area Community College, and Veterans Park. It is open to cyclists and pedestrians.
 City Island and Beach
 Italian Lake, 9.4 acre park located in the Uptown neighborhood.
 Paxtang Park, a historic 40-acre trolley park in the 1900s, restored in 2020 as a park with mountain bike trails
 Reservoir Park
 Riverfront Park
 Wildwood Lake Park

Sports

Harrisburg serves as the hub of professional sports in South Central Pennsylvania. A host of teams compete in the region including three professional baseball teams, the Harrisburg Senators, the Lancaster Barnstormers, and the York Revolution.  The Senators are the oldest team of the three, with the current incarnation playing since 1987. The original Harrisburg Senators began playing in the Eastern League in 1924.  Playing its home games at Island Field, the team won the league championship in the 1927, 1928, and 1931 seasons.  The Senators played a few more seasons before flood waters destroyed Island Field in 1936, effectively ending Eastern League participation for fifty-one years.  In 1940, Harrisburg gained an Interstate League team affiliated with the Pittsburgh Pirates; however, the team remained in the city only until 1943, when it moved to nearby York and renamed the York Pirates.  The current Harrisburg Senators, affiliated with the Washington Nationals, have won the Eastern League championship in the 1987, 1993, 1996, 1997, 1998, and 1999 seasons.

Government

City of Harrisburg

The Rev. Dr. Martin Luther King Jr. City Government Center, the first government building (and only city hall) in the United States named after the Civil Rights Movement leader, serves as a central location for the administrative functions of the city.
Harrisburg has been served since 1970 by the "strong mayor" form of municipal government, with separate executive and legislative branches. The Mayor serves a four-year term with no term limits. As the full-time chief executive, the Mayor oversees the operation of 34 agencies, run by department and office heads, some of whom form the Mayor's cabinet, including the Department of Public Safety (which includes the Bureau of Police, Bureau of Fire, and Bureau of Codes), Public Works, Business Administration, Parks and Recreation, Incineration and Steam Generation, Building & Housing Development, and Solicitor. The city had 424 full-time employees in 2019 (Water and Sewer employees were transferred to Capital Region Water effective 2013). The current mayor of Harrisburg is Wanda Williams whose term expires January 2026.

There are seven city council members, all elected at large, who serve part-time for four-year terms. There are two other elected city posts, city treasurer and city controller, who separately head their own fiscally related offices.

The city government had been in financial distress for many years in the 2000s. It has operated under the state's Act 47 Harrisburg Strong Plan provisions since 2011. The Act provides for municipalities that are in a state akin to bankruptcy. The city balanced its budget in the late 2010s, was expected to have a surplus of $1 million in 2019, and maintained a surplus in 2020 despite COVID-19.

Property tax reform
Harrisburg is also known nationally for its use of a two-tiered land value taxation. Harrisburg has taxed land at a rate six times that on improvements since 1975, and this policy has been credited by its former mayor Stephen R. Reed, as well as by the city's former city manager during the 1980s, with reducing the number of vacant structures located in downtown Harrisburg from about 4,200 in 1982 to fewer than 500 in 1995. During this same period of time between 1982 and 1995, nearly 4,700 more city residents became employed, the crime rate dropped 22.5% and the fire rate dropped 51%.

Harrisburg, as well as nearly 20 other Pennsylvania cities, employs a two-rate or split-rate property tax, which requires the taxing of the value of land at a higher rate and the value of the buildings and improvements at a lower one. This can be seen as a compromise between pure LVT and an ordinary property tax falling on real estate (land value plus improvement value). Alternatively, two-rate taxation may be seen as a form that allows gradual transformation of the traditional real estate property tax into a pure land value tax.

Nearly two dozen local Pennsylvania jurisdictions, such as Harrisburg, use two-rate property taxation in which the tax on land value is higher and the tax on improvement value is lower. In 2000, Florenz Plassmann and Nicolaus Tideman wrote that when comparing Pennsylvania cities using a higher tax rate on land value and a lower rate on improvements with similar sized Pennsylvania cities using the same rate on land and improvements, the higher land value taxation leads to increased construction within the jurisdiction.

Dauphin County

Dauphin County Government Complex, in downtown Harrisburg, serves the administrative functions of the county. The trial court of general jurisdiction for Harrisburg rests with the Court of Dauphin County and is largely funded and operated by county resources and employees.

Commonwealth of Pennsylvania

The Pennsylvania State Capitol Complex dominates the city's stature as a regional and national hub for government and politics. All administrative functions of the Commonwealth of Pennsylvania are located within the complex and at various nearby locations.

The Commonwealth Judicial Center houses Pennsylvania's three appellate courts, which are located in Harrisburg. The Supreme Court of Pennsylvania, which is the court of last resort in the state, hears arguments in Harrisburg as well as Philadelphia and Pittsburgh. The Superior Court of Pennsylvania and the Commonwealth Court of Pennsylvania are located here. Judges for these courts are elected at large.

Federal government
The Ronald Reagan Federal Building and Courthouse, located in downtown Harrisburg, serves as the regional administrative offices of the federal government. A branch of the U.S. District Court for the Middle District of Pennsylvania is also located within the courthouse. Due to Harrisburg's prominence as the state capital, federal offices for nearly every agency are located within the city.

The United States military has a strong historic presence in the region. A large retired military population resides in South Central Pennsylvania and the region is home to a large national cemetery at Indiantown Gap. The federal government, including the military, is the top employer in the metropolitan area.

Military bases in the Harrisburg area include:

Transport

Airports
Domestic and international airlines provide service via Harrisburg International Airport (MDT), which is located southeast of the city in Middletown. HIA is the third-busiest commercial airport in Pennsylvania, in terms of both passengers served and cargo shipments. Generally, due to the lack of an airline hub, the more popular airports in the region are Baltimore, Dulles, and Philadelphia. However, nearly 1.2 million people fly out of Harrisburg each year.

 Passenger carriers that serve HIA include American Airlines, United Airlines, Delta Air Lines, Frontier Airlines, and Allegiant Air. Capital City Airport (CXY), a moderate-sized business class and general aviation airport, is located across the Susquehanna River in the nearby suburb of New Cumberland, south of Harrisburg. Both airports are owned and operated by the Susquehanna Area Regional Airport Authority (SARAA), which also manages the Franklin County Regional Airport in Chambersburg and Gettysburg Regional Airport in Gettysburg.

From the 1940s to 1960s, the Harrisburg Seaplane Base on the West Shore of the Susquehanna River facilitated the landing and docking of seaplanes in the river between the M. Harvey Taylor Memorial Bridge and the Walnut Street Bridge, until it was converted into a marina and boat dealership.

Public transit

Harrisburg is served by Capital Area Transit (CAT) which provides public bus and paratransit service throughout the greater metropolitan area. Construction of a commuter rail line designated the Capital Red Rose Corridor, previously named CorridorOne, was planned to link the city with nearby Lancaster until plans went dormant in 2011.

Long-term plans for the region called for the commuter rail line to continue westward to Cumberland County, ending at Carlisle. In early 2005, the project hit a roadblock when the Cumberland County commissioners opposed the plan to extend commuter rail to the West Shore. Due to lack of support from the county commissioners, the Cumberland County portion, and the two new stations in Harrisburg have been removed from the project. In the future, with support from Cumberland County, the commuter rail project may extend to both shores of the Susquehanna River, where the majority of the commuting base for the Harrisburg–Carlisle metropolitan statistical area resides.

In 2006, a second phase of the rail project designated CorridorTwo was announced to the general public. It was planned to link downtown Harrisburg with its eastern suburbs in Dauphin and Lebanon counties, including the areas of Hummelstown, Hershey and Lebanon, and the city of York in York County. Other planned passenger rail corridors also included Route 15 from the Harrisburg area towards Gettysburg, as well as the Susquehanna River communities north of Harrisburg, and the Northern Susquehanna Valley region.

Intercity bus service
The lower level of the Harrisburg Transportation Center serves as the city's intercity bus terminal. Daily bus services are provided by Greyhound, Capitol Trailways, and Fullington Trailways. They connect Harrisburg to other Pennsylvania cities such as Allentown, Philadelphia, Pittsburgh, Reading, Scranton, State College, Williamsport, and York and nearby, out-of-state cities such as Baltimore, Binghamton, New York, Syracuse, and Washington, D.C., plus many other destinations via transfers.

Curbside intercity bus service is also provided by Megabus from the parking lot of the Harrisburg Mall in nearby Swatara Township, with direct service to Philadelphia, State College, and Pittsburgh.

Regional scheduled line bus service
The public transit provider in York County, Rabbit Transit, operates its RabbitEXPRESS bus service from York via Route 83N and from Gettysburg via Route 15N which serves both downtown Harrisburg and the main campus for Harrisburg Area Community College. The commuter-oriented service is designed to serve residents from these areas who work in Harrisburg, though reverse commutes are possible under the current schedule. Route 83N makes limited stops in the city of York and at two park and rides along Interstate 83 between York and Harrisburg before making multiple stops in Harrisburg, while Route 15N makes two stops in Gettysburg and at two park and rides along U.S. Route 15 between Gettysburg and Harrisburg before making multiple stops in Harrisburg.

Lebanon Transit operates the Commute King A and Commute King B express bus routes which connect Lebanon to Harrisburg via U.S. Route 422 and Interstate 81 respectively.

A charter/tour bus operator, R & J Transport, also provides weekday, scheduled route commuter service for people working in downtown Harrisburg. R & J, which is based in Schuylkill County, operates two lines, one between Frackville and downtown Harrisburg and the other between Minersville, Pine Grove, and downtown Harrisburg.

Rail

The Pennsylvania Railroad's main line from New York to Chicago passed through Harrisburg. The line was electrified in the 1930s, with the wires reaching Harrisburg in 1938. They went no further. Plans to electrify through to Pittsburgh and thence to Chicago never saw fruition; sufficient funding was never available. Thus, Harrisburg became where the PRR's crack expresses such as the Broadway Limited changed from electric traction to (originally) a steam locomotive, and later a diesel locomotive. Harrisburg remained a freight rail hub for PRR's successor Conrail, which was later sold off and divided between Norfolk Southern and CSX.

Freight rail
Norfolk Southern acquired all of Conrail's lines in the Harrisburg area and has continued the city's function as a freight rail hub. Norfolk Southern considers Harrisburg one of many primary hubs in its system, and operates 2 intermodal (rail/truck transfer) yards in the immediate Harrisburg area. The Harrisburg Intermodal Yard (formerly called Lucknow Yard) is located in the north end of Harrisburg, approximately 3 miles north of downtown Harrisburg and the Harrisburg Transport Center, while the Rutherford Intermodal Yard is located approximately 6 miles east of downtown Harrisburg in Swatara Township, Dauphin County. Norfolk Southern also operates a significant classification yard in the Harrisburg area, the Enola Yard, which is located across the Susquehanna River from Harrisburg in East Pennsboro Township, Cumberland County.

Intercity passenger rail
Amtrak provides service to and from Harrisburg. The passenger rail operator runs its Keystone Service and Pennsylvanian routes between New York, Philadelphia, and the Harrisburg Transportation Center daily. The Pennsylvanian route, which operates once daily, continues west to Pittsburgh. As of April 2007, Amtrak operates 14 weekday roundtrips and 8 weekend roundtrips daily between Harrisburg, Lancaster, and Philadelphia 30th Street Station; most of these trains also travel to and from New York Penn Station. The Keystone Corridor between Harrisburg and Philadelphia was improved in the mid-first decade of the 21st century, with the primary improvements completed in late 2006. The improvements included upgrading the electrical catenary, installing continuously welded rail, and replacing existing wooden railroad ties with concrete ties. These improvements increased train speeds to 110 mph along the corridor and reduced the travel time between Harrisburg and Philadelphia to as little as 95 minutes. It also eliminated the need to change locomotives at 30th Street Station (from diesel to electric and vice versa) for trains continuing to or coming from New York. As of Federal Fiscal Year 2008, the Harrisburg Transportation Center was the 2nd busiest Amtrak station in Pennsylvania and 21st busiest in the United States.

Roads and bridges

Harrisburg is served by several major roads. Interstate 76 (Pennsylvania Turnpike) passes south of the city and has access via two interchanges, running west toward Pittsburgh and east toward Philadelphia. Interstate 81 passes to the north of Harrisburg and heads southwest toward Carlisle and northeast toward Hazleton. Interstate 83 begins at I-81 near Harrisburg and heads south and west through the center of Harrisburg before continuing south toward York and Baltimore. Interstate 283 connects I-76 and I-83 southeast of Harrisburg. U.S. Route 11 and U.S. Route 15 pass through the western suburbs of Harrisburg, heading north concurrent from Camp Hill up the west bank of the Susquehanna River toward Selinsgrove. South of Camp Hill, US 11 heads southwest toward Carlisle and US 15 heads south toward Gettysburg. U.S. Route 22 and U.S. Route 322 head northwest concurrent from Harrisburg toward Lewistown. US 22 passes through the northern portion of Harrisburg before it heads northeast toward Allentown. US 322 bypasses Harrisburg along I-81 and I-83 before heading east toward Hershey. Pennsylvania Route 230 heads south from US 22 in the northern part of Harrisburg and passes through the city along Cameron Street. Pennsylvania Route 283 heads southeast from I-283 on a freeway toward Lancaster. Pennsylvania Route 581 connects I-81 and I-83 on a freeway through the western suburbs of Harrisburg. I-81, I-83, and PA 581 form the Capital Beltway that circles Harrisburg.

Harrisburg is the location of over a dozen large bridges, many up to a mile long, that cross the Susquehanna River. Several other important structures span the Paxton Creek watershed and Cameron Street, linking Downtown with neighborhoods in East Harrisburg. These include the State Street Bridge, also known as the Soldiers and Sailor's Memorial Bridge, and the Mulberry Street Bridge. Walnut Street Bridge, now used only by pedestrians and cyclists, links the downtown and Riverfront Park areas with City Island but goes no further as spans are missing on its western side due to massive flooding resulting from the North American blizzard of 1996.

Education

Public schools

Harrisburg is served by the Harrisburg School District. The school district provides education for the city's youth beginning with all-day kindergarten through twelfth grade. In 2003, SciTech High, a regional math and science magnet school (affiliated with Harrisburg University), opened its doors to local students.

Public Charter Schools
The city also has several public charter schools: Infinity Charter School, Sylvan Heights Science Charter School, Premier Arts and Science Charter School and Capital Area School for the Arts.

The Central Dauphin School District, the largest public school district in the Harrisburg–Carlisle metropolitan statistical area and the 13th largest in Pennsylvania, has several Harrisburg postal addresses for many of the District's schools. Steelton-Highspire School District borders much of the Harrisburg School District.

Private schools
Harrisburg is home to an extensive Catholic educational system. There are nearly 40 parish-driven elementary schools and seven Catholic high schools within the region administered by the Roman Catholic Diocese of Harrisburg, including Bishop McDevitt High School and Trinity High School. Numerous other private schools, such as The Londonderry School and The Circle School, which is a Sudbury Model school, also operate in Harrisburg. Harrisburg Academy, founded in 1784, is one of the oldest independent college preparatory schools in the nation. The Rabbi David L. Silver Yeshiva Academy, founded in 1944, is a progressive, modern Jewish day school. Also, Harrisburg is home to Harrisburg Christian School, founded in 1955.

Higher education
Dixon University Center, located in Uptown, serves as the office of Chancellor and the central headquarters of the Pennsylvania State System of Higher Education (PASSHE). With a total student enrollment 110,428, PASSHE is one of the largest university systems in the United States
Harrisburg Area Community College: the original campus of the college, the Harrisburg Campus, and Penn Center and Midtown campus which are branches of the Harrisburg Campus are located in Harrisburg. Newer campuses are located in Gettysburg, Lancaster, Lebanon and York
Harrisburg University of Science and Technology, located Downtown
Messiah College's Harrisburg Institute, located Downtown
Penn State Harrisburg Eastgate Center, located Downtown
Temple University Harrisburg Campus, located Downtown
Widener University Commonwealth Law School

Libraries
Dauphin County Law Library
Dauphin County Library System, with eight branches in Harrisburg and suburban Dauphin County
McCormick Library of Harrisburg Area Community College
Harrisburg University Library
Penn State Harrisburg Library
State Library of Pennsylvania, which includes the Pennsylvania Law Library
Medical library services of UPMC Pinnacle
Law Library, Widener University School of Law

Notable people

Since the early 18th century, Harrisburg has been home to many people of note. Because it is the seat of government for the state and lies relatively close to other urban centers, Harrisburg has played a significant role in the nation's political, cultural and industrial history. "Harrisburgers" have also taken a leading role in the development of Pennsylvania's history for over two centuries. Two former U.S. Secretaries of War, Simon Cameron and Alexander Ramsey and several other prominent political figures, such as former speaker of the house Newt Gingrich, hail from Harrisburg. The actor Don Keefer was born near Harrisburg, along with the actor Richard Sanders, most famous for playing Les Nessman in WKRP in Cincinnati. Many notable individuals are interred at Harrisburg Cemetery and East Harrisburg Cemetery.

Actors
 Eric Mabius, actor Ugly Betty
 Matt Cook, television, actor Man with a Plan
John A. Ellsler (1821–1903), actor and theatre manager, born in Harrisburg
Nancy Kulp, actress
Mark Malkoff, comedian and filmmaker
Eric Martsolf, actor and singer
Pauline Moore, actress
Ciara Renée, actress

Artists, designers 
 Grafton Tyler Brown, first African American artist to create works depicting the Pacific Northwest and California
Stephanie A. Johnson (born 1952), mixed media artist, educator
Rachel Nabors, cartoonist
Barbara Tyson Mosley (born 1950) American mixed media artist.

Musicians 
 Glenn Branca, avant-garde composer and guitarist
 Justin Duerr, musician and artist
 James Allen Gähres, music conductor
 Dan Hartman, musician, singer, songwriter, and record producer
 Gene "Birdlegg" Pittman, blues harmonicist, singer and songwriter.
 Rudi Protrudi, rock musician
 Bobby Troup, actor, jazz pianist, and songwriter
 Robert White, musician

Politics, military, activism 
Betty Andujar, first Republican woman to serve in Texas State Senate (1973–1983), was born in Harrisburg in 1912
David Conner, U.S. Navy commodore
Candace Gingrich, civil rights activist
Newt Gingrich, U.S. Representative 1979–99, Speaker of the House; born in Harrisburg.
Charles P. Mason, Vice admiral in the Navy during World War II and Navy Cross recipient
Daniel C. Miller, Harrisburg City Controller
Bruce I. Smith, state representative, Pennsylvania House of Representatives
George W. Smith, Major General in the Marine Corps
William Trickett Smith, lawyer and the former chairman of the Dauphin County Republican Party
Perry A. Stambaugh, member of the Pennsylvania House of Representatives, District 86
Robert J. Stevenson, actor and politician, born 1915 in Harrisburg, Los Angeles City Council member.
M. Harvey Taylor, Pennsylvania State Senator
LeRoy Zimmerman, 40th Attorney General of Pennsylvania

Sports

Writers 
 James Boyd, a resident of Front Street, wrote a novel about the city in 1935, Roll River.
Thomas Morris Chester, prominent Black journalist, lawyer, and soldier in the Civil War, was born here.
Carmen Finestra, television producer and writer.
Jimmy Gownley, New York Times best-selling author and illustrator of Amelia Rules!.
John O'Hara, author, a native of Pottsville, lived in Harrisburg briefly to write his novel about the city, A Rage to Live.
Adam Resnick, comedic author, wrote about growing up in Harrisburg in his book Will Not Attend, and wrote the screenplay for Lucky Numbers (2000), a film taking place in Harrisburg.
Will Stanton, long-published humor writer.
John Wyeth, publisher of Wyeth's Repository of Sacred Music (1810; Second Part 1813).

Others 
James Milnor Coit, teacher
Carl Cover, aviation pioneer and test pilot
Lindsay Czarniak, ESPN anchor
Margaret B. Denning (1856-1935), missionary and temperance worker
Alan Isaacman, lawyer who argued Hustler Magazine v. Falwell before the Supreme Court of the United States
Agnes Kemp (1823–1908), American physician and temperance movement leader
Clyde A. Lynch, president of Lebanon Valley College
Kenneth W. Mack, historian and professor at Harvard Law School
Edward C. Malesic, Catholic Bishop of Cleveland
Robert James Miller, Medal of Honor recipient
Frank Soday, chemist influential in development of alternative uses for synthetic fiber
Dan Wilson, biologist and science communicator

See also

List of cities and towns along the Susquehanna River
List of hospitals in Harrisburg

Notes

References

External links

Hershey-Harrisburg Regional Visitors Bureau
Harrisburg Regional Chamber of Commerce

 
18th-century establishments in Pennsylvania
1719 establishments in Pennsylvania
Cities in Dauphin County, Pennsylvania
County seats in Pennsylvania
Government units that have filed for Chapter 9 bankruptcy
Harrisburg–Carlisle metropolitan statistical area
Pennsylvania populated places on the Susquehanna River
Populated places established in 1719
Populated places on the Underground Railroad